Belardinelli is a surname. Notable people with the surname include:

Daniel Belardinelli (born 1961), American artist 
Massimo Belardinelli (1938–2007), Italian comic artist